The Lexile Framework for Reading is an educational tool that uses a measure called a Lexile to match readers with books, articles and other leveled reading resources. Readers and books are assigned a score on the Lexile scale, in which lower scores reflect easier readability for books and lower reading ability for readers. The Lexile framework uses quantitative methods, based on individual words and sentence lengths, rather than qualitative analysis of content to produce scores. Accordingly, the scores for texts do not reflect factors such as multiple levels of meaning or maturity of themes. Hence, the United States Common Core State Standards recommend the use of alternative, qualitative methods for selecting books for students at grade 6 and over. In the US, Lexile measures are reported from reading programs and assessments annually. Thus, about half of U.S. students in grades 3rd through 12th receive a Lexile measure each year. In addition to being used in schools in all 50 states, Lexile measures are also used outside of the United States.

Components of the Lexile framework 
The Lexile framework for reading is made up of Lexile reader measures and Lexile text measures, both of which are put on the Lexile scale.

Lexile scale
The Lexile scale runs from BR300 (Lexile) to above 2000L, though there is not an explicit bottom or top to the scale. Scores 0L and below are reported as BR (Beginning Reader). These books or students may be coded as Lexile: BR. In some cases, a student will receive a BR code followed by a number (e.g. Lexile: BR150L). A measure of BR150L indicates that the lexile measure is 150 units below 0L.

Lexile measure

A Lexile measure is defined as "the numeric representation of an individual's reading ability or a text's readability (or difficulty), followed by an "L" (Lexile)". There are two types of Lexile measures: Lexile reader measures and Lexile text measures. A Lexile reader measure typically is obtained when an individual completes a reading comprehension test. Once a field study has been performed to link Lexile Framework with the test, the individual's reading score can be reported as a Lexile measure.

For an individual, a Lexile measure is typically obtained from a reading comprehension assessment or program. These range from the adolescent level (DIBELS: Dynamic indicators of basic early literacy skills) to the adult level (TABE: Test of adult basic education). A Lexile text measure is obtained by evaluating the readability of a piece of text, such as a book or an article. The Lexile Analyzer, a software program specially designed to evaluate reading demand, analyzes the text's semantic (word frequency) and syntactic (sentence length) characteristics and assigns it a Lexile measure. Over 60,000 Web sites, 115,000 fiction and nonfiction books, and 80 million articles have Lexile measures, and these numbers continue to grow. Over 150 publishers including Capstone Publishers, Discovery Ed, Houghton Mifflin Harcourt, McGraw-Hill, Pearson PLC, Riverside Publishing, Scholastic Corporation, Simon & Schuster, Workman Publishing Company, and World Book offer certified Lexile text measures for their materials.

The maker claims that noting the Lexile measure of a text can assist in selecting "targeted" materials that present an appropriate level of challenge for a reader – not too difficult to be frustrating, yet difficult enough to challenge a reader and encourage reading growth. 

There is no direct correspondence between a specific Lexile measure and a specific grade level.

Lexile codes
Some books get Lexile codes—two-letter designations that appear before the Lexile measure—to give more information about the book relating to its developmental appropriateness, reading difficulty, and common or intended use.  BR is the only code that can apply to both readers and text.

History 
Lexile framework was founded in 1989 by MetaMetrics Stenner and Malbert Smith Funding for developing a better measurement system for reading and writing  was provided by the National Institutes of Health through the Small Business Innovation Research grant program. Over the 12-year period from 1984 through 1996, Stenner and Smith received a total of five grants on measurement of literacy. Development of the Lexile framework was fueled by conversations and comments from John B. Carroll (UNC-Chapel Hill) and Benjamin Wright (University of Chicago), and with mathematical and psychometrical assistance from Donald S. Burdick, associate professor emeritus of Statistical Science, Duke University and Stenner founded Metrametrics in 1997.

The measurement ideas embedded in the Lexile framework can be found in two 1982–83 articles by Stenner and Smith. when they participated in the evaluation of Head Start, comparing different programs from across the country that used different outcome measures.

Independent evaluations 
In Mesmer's Tools for Matching Readers to Texts: Research Based Practices, she stated that the Lexile Framework for Reading was valid, reliable, and had "excellent psychometric properties."

Mesmer mentioned Walpole, and details a study which used Lexile to match 47 second-grade readers to text books. The study found that Lexile was successful at matching students to texts with respect to reading accuracy (93%), but not at matching readers to texts that they could read at an acceptable rate: "Without support, either in the form of fluency modeling or repeated reading, these texts would be too difficult for these students to read productively on their own."

In 2002, the Lexile framework was evaluated by Dale Carlson. The independent consultant found that the Lexile framework had a "well-delineated theoretical foundation." Both Carlson and Mesmer have remarked on the positive and unique characteristic of having both the student and text on the same scale.

In 2001, the National Center for Educational Statistics (NCES) formally reviewed Lexile measures. The report acknowledged the science behind Lexile measures: “The panel affirmed the value of both sentence length and word frequency as overall measures of semantic and syntactic complexity....” Additionally, according to one panel member, the Lexile Framework appears “…exceptional in the psychometric care with which it has been developed; the extent of its formal validation with different populations of texts, tests, and children; in its automation; and in its developers’ continual quest to improve it.” However, the report also identified a number of issues and the different authors identified a range of concerns, such as the exclusion of factors such as reader knowledge, motivation and interest: "The notion of purpose in reading is excluded in the Lexile Framework. This is a serious oversight because of the dramatic effects that purpose can have on reading."

Criticism 
Stephen Krashen, educational researcher in language acquisition and professor emeritus at the University of Southern California, raised serious concerns with the Lexile rating system in his article, "The Lexile Framework: Unnecessary and Potentially Harmful."  Krashen argues that a reading difficulty rating system limits children's choices and steers them away from reading books in which they may be interested.

Furthermore, like most reading formulas, the formula used to determine a book's Lexile level can often lead to a flawed rating. For example, The Library Mouse, by Daniel Kirk, is a 32-page children's picture book rated by Amazon.com as "for ages 4-8"  and has a Lexile score of 830.  However, Stephenie Meyer's 498-page, young adult novel Twilight only garners a Lexile score of 720. Similarly, Beverly Cleary's Ramona Quimby, Age 8, has a Lexile score of 860, while Michael Crichton's Jurassic Park only has a score of 710.

Elfrieda H. Hiebert, Professor of Educational Psychology at University of California, Berkeley, noted in her study, "Interpreting Lexiles in Online Contexts and with Informational Texts", "The variability across individual parts of texts can be extensive.  Within a single chapter of Pride and Prejudice, for example, 125-word excerpts of text (the unit of assessments used to obtain students' Lexile levels) that were pulled from every 1,000 words had Lexiles that ranged from 670 to 1310, with an average of 952.  The range of 640 on the LS [Lexile Scale] represents the span from third grade to college."

Hiebert also demonstrated that slight changes in punctuation, such as changing commas to periods, resulted in "significant reclassification on the LS [Lexile scale].

Many extremely difficult reads, such as "Native Son" by Richard Wright, are ranked with an unexpectedly low Lexile score. "The Grapes of Wrath", written by John Steinbeck, still bewilders readers today and has a Lexile score of only 680L.

Besides limiting children's reading choices and misrepresenting books' reading difficulty, the Lexile Scale has had negative effects at a systemic level. When school districts and states began to mandate specific readability programs, textbook publishers responded by manipulating texts to tailor them to the requirements of the readability formulas.

Furthermore, the Lexile framework costs states and school districts valuable resources. Even though other readability formulas, such as the Flesch–Kincaid used in Microsoft Word's software, are widely used to establish reading levels and difficulty, the Lexile scale is the major method of establishing text difficulty in American schools.  However, unlike readability formulas of the past, MetaMetrics, the creator of the Lexile framework, "retained the processing of readability as intellectual property, requiring educators and other clients to pay for their services to obtain readability levels." Mesmer lists the cost of using the Lexile inventory tools as one of the disadvantages of using the system.

Common core standards
Lexile measures are cited in the US Common Core State Standards for English Language Arts to provide text complexity grade and corresponding Lexile ranges. These grade and Lexile ranges are used to help determine at what text complexity level students should be reading to help ensure students are prepared for the reading demands of college and careers. However, this also notes that quantitative methods, including Lexile scores, often underestimate the challenges posed by complex narrative fiction which might use relatively simple prose. The Core standards note that until quantitative methods are able to take into account the factors that might make such texts challenging, preference should be given to qualitative measures of text complexity when evaluating narrative fiction intended for students in grade 6 and over.

Examples of books with Lexile measures 

More examples are available here.

Use
As of 2010, over 40 reading assessments and programs report Lexile measures, including many popular instruments from Scholastic, Pearson, CTB/McGraw-Hill and Riverside Publishing, as well as a growing number of year-end state assessments.

Reading assessments that report Lexile measures
Source:

State assessments
 Arizona's Instrument to Measure Standards (AIMS)
 California English-Language Arts Standards Test
 Delaware Comprehensive Assessment System
 Florida Assessments for Instruction in Reading (FAIR)
 Georgia Georgia Milestones and the Georgia High School Graduation Test (GM and GHSGT)
 Hawaii State Assessment
 Illinois Standards Achievement Test (ISAT)
 Kansas State Assessments of Reading
 Kentucky Core Curriculum Test (KCCT)
 Minnesota Comprehensive Assessments (MCA)
 New Mexico Standards-Based Assessment (SBA)
 North Carolina End-of-Grade and English I End-of-Course (NCEOG and NCEOC)
 Oklahoma Core Curriculum Test (OCCT)
 Oregon Assessment of Knowledge and Skills (OAKS)
 South Carolina Palmetto Assessment of State Standards (PASS)
 South Dakota State Test of Educational Progress (DSTEP)
 Tennessee Comprehensive Assessment Program (TCAP) Achievement Test
 Texas Assessment of Knowledge and Skills (TAKS)
 Virginia  Standards of Learning Tests (SOL)
 West Virginia WESTEST 2
 Proficiency Assessments for Wyoming Students (PAWS)

Norm-referenced assessments
 CTB/McGraw-Hill|CTB/McGraw-Hill: TerraNova (CAT/6 and CTBS/5) and Tests of Adult Basic Education (TABE)
 ERB: Comprehensive Testing Program, 4th Edition (CTP 4)
 Pearson: Stanford 9, Stanford 10, MAT 8, and Aprenda 3

Interim/benchmark assessments
 American Education Corporation: A+ LearningLink assessment
 Dynamic Measurement Group: Dynamic Indicators of Basic Early Literacy Skills (DIBELS)
 Florida Center for Reading Research: Florida Assessments for Instruction in Reading
 Measured Progress: Progress Toward Standards (PTS3)
 NWEA: Measures of Academic Progress (MAP)
 Pearson: Stanford Diagnostic Reading Test, Fourth Edition (SDRT 4) and Stanford Learning First
 Scantron: Performance Series
 Scholastic: Scholastic Reading Inventory (SRI)

Spanish assessments
 Achieve3000: KidBiz3000; Grades 2-8, TeenBiz3000; Grades 9-12
 New Mexico Standards-Based Assessment Grades 3-9, 11
 Pearson: Aprenda 3
 Scholastic Reading Inventory
 Texas Assessment of Knowledge and Skills (TAKS)-Spanish; Grades 3-6

International assessments
 E-LQ Assessment
 GL Assessment, Progress in English (PIE) assessment; ages 7–11
 ETS: TOEFL
 ETS: TOEIC
 Scholastic International

Assessments for homeschoolers
 BJU Press Testing and Evaluation: Stanford and Iowa achievement tests
 EdGate: Total Reader (TR)
 Riverside Publishing: Gates-MacGinitie Reading Tests
 Riverside Publishing: Iowa Tests of Basic Skills (ITBS)

References

Readability tests